"Sha-La-La-La-Lee" was the third song by English R&B-influenced group Small Faces, recorded in December 1965 and released on 28 January 1966, reaching number three in the UK Singles Chart. It was also the first single by the group to feature Ian McLagan on keyboards.

Background
Because Small Faces' previous song release, the Marriott/Lane composition "I've Got Mine," failed to chart in the UK, their manager, Don Arden, determined that the Small Faces would not be one hit wonders, decided to bring in well-known songwriters Kenny Lynch and Mort Shuman to make sure the group's next single would be a success.

The commercial-sounding song proved a big hit and reached number three in the UK singles chart. Despite the success of "Sha-La-La-La-Lee," the band never really liked the song and felt it did not represent their sound, which was more R&B- and soul-oriented.

Following the huge success of this song, the band developed a large female fan base, like many of their contemporaries. This situation would ultimately end in Marriott becoming so disenchanted that he would leave The Small Faces in 1969 in a bid to be seen as a serious musician and form his next group, the heavier rock- and blues-sounding Humble Pie.

Small Faces performed "Sha-La-La-La-Lee" live for the Dick Clark show in the United States, telerecorded from the UK.

B-side
The B-side "Grow Your Own" written by the band, is an instrumental recording and strongly influenced in style by Booker T. & the M.G.'s, of whom all the group were big fans.  "Grow Your Own" heavily features Ian McLagan on the Hammond organ.

Usage

In Japan, "Sha-La-La-La-Lee", arranged to French pop style, was used for the advertisement of Suzuki Alto Lapin.

It was used in the second episode of the first season of the 2019 British TV series, Sex Education.

Personnel
Steve Marriott – lead and backing vocals, electric guitar
Ronnie Lane – bass guitar, backing vocals
Ian McLagan –  Hammond organ, piano, backing vocals
Kenney Jones – drums
Kenny Lynch - backing vocals

Other recordings
 German band The Rattles released their cover version in February 1966 as The ´In´ Crowd, single Star Club Records 148 547, 02.1966.
 Yugoslav rock band Siluete covered this song with Serbo-Croatian lyrics under title "Tvoj rođendan" ("Your Birthday") in 1966.
 Czech singer Václav Neckář also did a cover version for this song in Czech in 1966.
 Evelyne Courtois, a French female singer of the 1960s, covered the song in 1966 as "Ce N'est Pas Une Vie" under her stage name 'Pussy Cat'.
 Plastic Bertrand also released a cover version of this song in French in 1978.

See also
Small Faces discography

Notes and references
Notes:

References:

Paolo Hewitt John Hellier (2004). Steve Marriott - All Too Beautiful.... Helter Skelter Publishing .
Paolo Hewitt/Kenney Jones (1995) small faces the young mods' forgotten story – Acid Jazz 

1966 singles
Small Faces songs
Songs with music by Mort Shuman
1966 songs
Decca Records singles